The Fool and Death (German: Narr und Tod) is a 1920 Austrian silent drama film directed by Rudolf Stiaßny and starring Lisa Kresse, Carl Goetz and Dora Kaiser.

Cast
 Lisa Kresse
 Carl Goetz
 Dora Kaiser
 Hans Lackner
 Paul Kronegg

References

Bibliography
 Janelle Blankenship & Tobias Nag.European Visions: Small Cinemas in Transition. Transcript, 2015

External links

1920 films
Austrian silent feature films
Films directed by Rudolf Stiaßny
1920 drama films
Austrian drama films
Mummy films
Austrian black-and-white films
Silent drama films
Silent horror films